Hanno Rund (26 October 1925 in Schwerin – 5 January 1993 in Tucson, Arizona) was a German mathematician. He wrote numerous publications, including perhaps his most famous, The Hamilton-Jacobi theory in the calculus of variations. Its role in mathematics and physics.

Rund received his Ph.D in 1950 from the University of Cape Town, South Africa. In 1952, he obtained his Habilitation
at the University of Freiburg in Germany. His notable students include David Lovelock and Martin Sade.

References

Books
 H. Rund, The Hamilton-Jacobi theory in the calculus of variations. Its role in mathematics and physics, D. Van Nostrand Company Ltd., 1966.
 H. Rund, The Differential Geometry of Finsler Spaces, Springer, Berlin, 1959.

External links
 

1925 births
1993 deaths
20th-century  German  mathematicians
University of Cape Town alumni
University of Arizona faculty
German expatriates in South Africa
Academic staff of the University of Waterloo
University of Freiburg alumni
German expatriates in Canada
German expatriates in the United States